The 1967–68 international cricket season was from December 1967 to April 1968.

Season overview

December

India in Australia

January

England in the West Indies

February

India in New Zealand

April

India in Ceylon

References

International cricket competitions by season
1967 in cricket
1968 in cricket